Djamel Ainaoui (born 20 March 1975) is a French wrestler. He competed in the 2000 Summer Olympics.

References

1975 births
Living people
Wrestlers at the 2000 Summer Olympics
French male sport wrestlers
Olympic wrestlers of France
People from Courrières
Mediterranean Games gold medalists for France
Mediterranean Games medalists in wrestling
Competitors at the 2001 Mediterranean Games
Sportspeople from Pas-de-Calais
21st-century French people